The 3rd Chicago Film Critics Association Awards were announced on March 7, 1991 during a ceremony at The Pump Room of the Omni Ambassador East Hotel. They honored the finest achievements in 1990 filmmaking. The nominees were announced on January 20, 1991. Goodfellas received the most nominations with seven, followed by Dances with Wolves with four. The former won the most awards with four, including Best Film. Actresses Kathy Bates and Joan Cusack earned two nominations each. This year was also notable for the introduction of two new categories: Best Cinematography and Best Screenplay.

Winners and nominees
The winners and nominees for the 3rd Chicago Film Critics Association Awards are as follows:

Films with multiple nominations and awards

References

External links
 

1990 film awards
 1990